The 2018–19 Atlas F.C. season is the 89th season in the football club's history and the 49th consecutive season in the top flight of Mexican football.

Coaching staff

Players

Squad information

Players and squad numbers last updated on 28 October 2018.Note: Flags indicate national team as has been defined under FIFA eligibility rules. Players may hold more than one non-FIFA nationality.

Transfers

In

Out

Competitions

Overview

Torneo Apertura

League table

Results summary

Result round by round

Matches

Apertura Copa MX

Group stage

Torneo Clausura

League table

Results summary

Result round by round

Matches

Clausura Copa MX

Group stage

Statistics

Goals

Clean sheets

References

External links

Mexican football clubs 2018–19 season
Club Atlas seasons
Atlas F.C. seasons